Main Stem is an album by American saxophonist Oliver Nelson with trumpeter Joe Newman. It was originally released in 1962 on Prestige Records, and reissued on CD in 1992.

Track listing
All compositions by Oliver Nelson, except where noted
"Main Stem" (Duke Ellington) - 6:52
"J & B" - 5:51
"Ho!" - 4:33
"Latino" - 6:12
"Tipsy" - 5:19
"Tangerine" (Johnny Mercer and Victor Schertzinger)- 7:03

Personnel
Oliver Nelson - tenor saxophone
Joe Newman - trumpet
Hank Jones - piano
George Duvivier - bass
Charlie Persip - drums
Ray Barretto - congas

References

Prestige Records albums
Oliver Nelson albums
1962 albums
Albums produced by Esmond Edwards
Albums recorded at Van Gelder Studio